Trifolium alpestre, the owl-head clover or purple-globe clover, is a species of flowering plant in the family Fabaceae, native to central, southern and Eastern Europe, the Caucasus, Turkey, and Iran. It reproduces both clonally and by seed.

References

alpestre
Flora of Denmark
Flora of Central Europe
Flora of France
Flora of Southeastern Europe
Flora of Eastern Europe
Flora of the Caucasus
Flora of Turkey
Flora of Iran
Plants described in 1763
Taxa named by Carl Linnaeus